Wehringen is a municipality  in the district of Augsburg in Bavaria in Germany it is located 15km south of Augsburg.

Mayors
Franz Öschay: 1945–1948
Georg Rott: 1948–1967
Franz Geirhos (CSU-FWV): 1967–1978
Johann Merk (CSU): 1978–2008
Manfred Nerlinger (CSU): since 2008

References

Augsburg (district)